Doko may be:

Doko language (Nigeria)
Doko language (Democratic Republic of Congo)